Edward A. Hickey (August 18, 1872 – March 25, 1941) was a third baseman in Major League Baseball who played briefly for the Chicago Orphans during the  season. He was born in Cleveland, Ohio.
 
In a one-season career, Hickey posted a .162 batting average (6-for-37) with four runs and three RBI in 10 games, including one stolen base, and did not have an extra-base hit.

Hickey died in Tacoma, Washington, at the age of 68.

External links

Retrosheet

1872 births
1941 deaths
Major League Baseball third basemen
Chicago Orphans players
Des Moines Prohibitionists players
Des Moines Indians players
Quincy Browns players
Quincy Ravens players
Indianapolis Hoosiers (minor league) players
Oakland Commuters players
Omaha Indians players
Little Rock Travelers players
Guthrie Senators players
Seattle Siwashes players
Butte Miners players
Baseball players from Cleveland